Lipinia venemai, also known as Brongersma's lipinia, is a species of skink endemic to Western New Guinea (Indonesia).

References

Lipinia
Reptiles of Western New Guinea
Endemic fauna of New Guinea
Endemic fauna of Indonesia
Reptiles described in 1953
Taxa named by Leo Brongersma
Skinks of New Guinea